Jamuna State Guest House is the official guest house of the government of Bangladesh for visiting heads of states located in Ramna Thana, Dhaka.

History
In 2005 the heads of SAARC governments met here for the SAARC conference which was held in Dhaka that year. In 2009 after Prime Minister Sheikh Hasina was elected she moved to Jamuna State Guest House as the official residence of the Prime Minister, Gonobhaban, was being renovated. She moved from her private residence to the guest house on the advice of intelligence agencies who were concerned over her security.

See also 
 Meghna state guest house

References

Buildings and structures in Dhaka
Official residences in Bangladesh
Palaces in Bangladesh